Amanita umbrinolutea, also known as the umber-zoned ringless amanita, is a species of the genus Amanita.

Description 

The cap of Amanita umbrinolutea is usually free of volval remnants, 45 – 90 mm wide, at first conico-paraboloid, then somewhat campanulate to convex and finally planar, umbonate, with a strongly striate margin (margins occupying around 25 – 35% of the whole cap's radius). The cap has a distinctive pattern of color, often dark in the center, then pale, then dark over the inner edges of the lamellae and on the ridges between the marginal striations and at other times pallid in the center, but also strongly zonate; intensity of pigmentation is variable, with the center ranging from umber to grayish umber-brown to beige or pale grayish brown even within a single collection. The gills are free, crowded, off-white to sordid pale cream in mass, and up to 6 mm (0.6 cm) broad; the short gills are truncate, of varying length, scattered and unevenly distributed.

The stem is 115 – 185 × 6 – 11 mm, pale cream to pale beige or isabella color or pale grayish brown, with a faint appressed zigzag girdles of fibrils, with a fleshy membranous sack-like volva at the base. The 30 – 40 mm high volva is attached to the bottom 5 mm or so of the stipe. The spores measure 10.5–13.4 × 9.5–12.5 (1.05–1.34 x 0.95–1.25 cm) μm and are subglobose (infrequently either globose or broadly ellipsoid) and inamyloid. Clamps are absent from the bases of basidia. Amanita umbrinolutea is widely distributed in Europe. The specimens different researchers and scientists have examined has all been found in association with conifers (including pine and spruce); and its range extends eastward at least to around northwestern Pakistan and northern India.

See also 
Amanita
List of Amanita Species

References 

Umbrinolutea